The 1995 CA-TennisTrophy was a men's tennis tournament played on indoor carpet courts at the Wiener Stadthalle in Vienna, Austria and was part of the World Series of the 1995 ATP Tour. It was the 21st edition of the tournament and was held from 16 October until 23 October 1995. Filip Dewulf won the singles title.

Finals

Singles

 Filip Dewulf defeated  Thomas Muster 7–5, 6–2, 1–6, 7–5
 It was Dewulf's only title of the year and the 2nd of his career.

Doubles

 Ellis Ferreira /  Jan Siemerink defeated  Todd Woodbridge /  Mark Woodforde 6–4, 7–5
 It was Ferreira's only title of the year and the 1st of his career. It was Siemerink's 2nd title of the year and the 7th of his career.

References

External links
 ATP tournament profile

 
CA-TennisTrophy
Vienna Open